"The Little Old Lady (from Pasadena)" is a song written by Don Altfeld, Jan Berry and Roger Christian, and recorded by 1960s American pop singers, Jan and Dean. Singer/songwriter P.F. Sloan sings the falsetto part usually sung by Dean Torrence, while Dean sings one of the backup parts.  This was the first time P.F. sang the falsetto on a single, although P.F. had already sung some falsetto on the last album Dead Man’s Curve/The New Girl In School.

Jan & Dean reworked the lyrics from "The Little Old Lady (from Pasadena)" in 1967, renaming the track "Tijuana" and releasing it as a single that same year. The lyrics now contained thinly-veiled references to marijuana use. "Tijuana" was to be included on the act's final album Carnival of Sound, completed in 1969, but the LP went unreleased for several decades. The record was circulated as a bootleg until it garnered official release in 2010.

The song was performed live by The Beach Boys at Sacramento Memorial Auditorium on August 1, 1964 for inclusion on their No.1 album Beach Boys Concert. The Beach Boys, and particularly Brian Wilson, who co-wrote several of Jan & Dean's biggest surf hits, had supported Jan & Dean in the recording studio to initiate them in the surf music genre.

Premise
The origins of "The Little Old Lady (from Pasadena)" stem from a very popular Dodge ad campaign in southern California that launched in early 1964. Starring actress Kathryn Minner, the commercials showed the white-haired elderly lady speeding down the street (and sometimes a drag strip) driving a modified Dodge. She would stop, look out the window and say "Put a Dodge in your garage, Hon-ey!". The song soon followed and Minner enjoyed great popularity until she died in 1969.

On December 18, 1949, on an episode of the Edgar Bergen and Charlie McCarthy radio show with June Allyson, a joke about a used horse being  owned by an old lady in Pasadena was made. ( See Old Time Radio Show Downloads, etc. for first hand material.) It appears evident by the audience reaction to this joke that this was a well-known running gag by this time.
In 1958, Alfred Hitchcock uses the phrase “a little old lady from Pasadena” in one of his intros for his TV series “Alfred Hitchcock Presents”.
"The Little Old Lady (from Pasadena)" was a folk archetype in Southern California in the mid-20th century. Part of this lore was that many an elderly man who died in Pasadena would leave his widow with a powerful car that she rarely, if ever, drove, such as an old Buick Roadmaster, or a vintage 1950s Cadillac, Ford,  Packard, Studebaker, DeSoto, or La Salle. According to the story, used car salesmen would tell prospective buyers that the previous owner of a vehicle was "a little old lady from Pasadena who only drove it to church on Sundays," thus suggesting the car had little wear.

Personnel
The session musicians who played on this record (who were collectively known as The Wrecking Crew) included Leon Russell on piano; Tommy Tedesco, Bill Pitman and Billy Strange on guitar; Ray Pohlman and Jimmy Bond on bass; and Hal Blaine and Earl Palmer on drums.

Chart performance
In 1964, the song reached number three on the Billboard Hot 100 chart, and number one on Canada's RPM chart.

In popular culture
During the 1960s, the term became a popular punchline for many comedians, particularly Johnny Carson, who often invoked it when he took The Tonight Show to Los Angeles before permanently moving it there in 1972.

In "the Gunslinger", the last episode of The Dick Van Dyke Show to be filmed (though it was not the last aired), Rob dreams he is a sheriff in the Old West, where a gun salesman (Allan Melvin) tries to sell him a pistol, telling him "This gun was only fired once -- to kill a little old lady in Pasadena".

The song was one of many California related songs played throughout "Sunshine Plaza" in the original Disney California Adventure.

The Dead Kennedys satirized the concept in their own song "Buzzbomb from Pasadena," where an elderly driver likewise terrorizes the city with her driving before getting into a shootout with police at a 7-11.

In Animaniacs, Slappy Squirrel once takes over the old lady's role in the song. Slappy's car in this case is not the Super Stock Dodge from the song, but rather a generic red sports car with a slight resemblance to a first generation Dodge Viper. That episode ends with her revealing that she "never took a lesson in her life" and being arrested.

References

External links
Lyrics of this song

Jan and Dean songs
The Beach Boys songs
1964 singles
Songs about California
Songs about Los Angeles
Songs written by Roger Christian (songwriter)
Songs written by Jan Berry
RPM Top Singles number-one singles
1964 songs
Liberty Records singles
Songs about cars
Songs about old age
Dodge